Avon is a town in the Farmington Valley region of Hartford County, Connecticut, United States. As of the 2020 census, the town had a population of 18,932.

History
At the end of the last Ice Age, 12,400 years BP of the Younger Dryas, nomadic peoples built a campsite adjacent to the river that would become known as the Farmington River. They were apparently the first people to populate the region that would become known as southern New England, including the region that would become Avon. Over the Paleoindian period the site was revisted multiple times by other nomadic peoples until it gradually became buried by sediment from the river's occasional flooding. In the winter of 2019, the campsite remains were excavated in Avon, along with stone tools and artifacts constructed from materials in neighboring regions.

Avon was settled in 1645 and was originally a part of neighboring Farmington.  In 1750, the parish of Northington was established in the northern part of Farmington, to support a Congregational church more accessible to the local population.  Its first pastor was Ebenezer Booge, a graduate of Yale Divinity School who arrived in 1751. The Farmington Canal's opening in 1828 brought new business to the village, which sat where the canal intersected the Talcott Mountain Turnpike linking Hartford to Albany, New York. Hopes of industrial and commercial growth spurred Avon to incorporate. In 1830, the Connecticut General Assembly incorporated Northington as the town of Avon, after County Avon in England.  Such expansion never came and, in the 1900s, the rural town became a suburban enclave.

In the 1960s Avon rejected the proposal for Interstate 291 coming through the southern edge of the town and successfully denied the expressway going through the town.

Avon Mountain traffic accidents
The section of Talcott Mountain, known as Avon Mountain, between Avon and West Hartford, is known for the climb of U.S. Route 44, and the most direct path to Hartford from much of the Farmington Valley and Litchfield County. One of the worst traffic accidents in Connecticut history occurred at the intersection of Route 44 and Route 10 at the foot of Avon Mountain.

On July 29, 2005, the driver of a dump truck lost control of his brakes and swerved to avoid traffic waiting in his lane at the stoplight. On the eastbound side of the road, the truck then collided with rush hour traffic waiting at the light. Four people, including the driver of the truck, died in the crash. Another driver involved in the accident died in 2008 from complications directly as a result of the crash. Former Governor M. Jodi Rell proposed safety improvements for this road in the aftermath of the accident.

In September 2007, the driver of another truck lost control. The truck, traveling westbound on U.S. Route 44 at Route 10, crashed into the Nassau Furniture building at about 11 am, taking out a column that supports the roof of the building. No major injuries resulted from the crash.

The accidents prompted the State of Connecticut to modify Route 44 through the addition of a runaway truck ramp just above the Avon Old Farms Inn and the straightening and widening of the road on the western slope of the mountain. The accidents and the reconstruction of the road have been heavily covered by local media including the Hartford Courant.

Geography

The East side of Avon is flanked by Talcott Mountain, part of the Metacomet Ridge, a mountainous trap rock ridgeline that stretches from Long Island Sound to near the Vermont border. Talcott Mountain is a popular outdoor recreation resource notable for its towering western cliff faces. The  Metacomet Trail traverses the Talcott Mountain ridge.

Demographics

As of the 2020 census, Avon had a population of 18,932.  The racial composition of the population was 82.3% White, 13.1% Asian, 4.9% Hispanic or Latino, 0.8% Black or African American, 0.7% from other races and 1.6% from two or more races.

As of the census of 2000, there were 15,832 people, 6,192 households, and 4,483 families residing in the town. The racial makeup of the town was 94.93% White, 0.98% African American, 0.05% Native American, 2.96% Asian, 0.02% Pacific Islander, 0.28% from other races, and 0.77% from two or more races. Hispanic or Latino of any race were 1.57% of the population.

There were 6,192 households, out of which 34.0% had children under the age of 18 living with them, 65.8% were married couples living together, 4.7% had a female householder with no husband present, and 27.6% were non-families. Of all households, 23.5% were made up of individuals, and 9.5% had someone living alone who was 65 years of age or older. The average household size was 2.53 and the average family size was 3.03.

In the town, the population was spread out, with 26.1% under the age of 18, 3.3% from 18 to 24, 26.1% from 25 to 44, 29.5% from 45 to 64, and 15.0% who were 65 years of age or older. The median age was 42 years. For every 100 females, there were 91.8 males. For every 100 females age 18 and over, there were 88.0 males.

In 2019, the median household income was $131,130 and the per capita income for the town was $71,347. About 0.9% of families and 1.7% of the population were below the poverty line, including 1.2% of those under age 18 and 1.9% of those age 65 or over.

Economy

Top employers
Top employers in Avon according to the town's 2021 Comprehensive Annual Financial Report

Arts and culture

Public library 
The Avon Free Public Library can be traced back to 1791 when Rev. Rufus Hawley started collecting money from residents to purchase books for a community library. In 1798, Samuel Bishop, a prominent citizen, began offering library services within his home with a collection of 111 titles.

The library is a member of Library Connection, Inc., the cooperative regional automated circulation and online catalog database system, CONNECT, to which 33 libraries belong.  Through this system, over 4 million volumes are available through interlibrary loan, the statewide reciprocal borrowing arrangement which encompasses over 160 libraries.

Notable locations and organizations

Avon Congregational Church built in 1819 and added to the National Register of Historic Places in 1972.
 The Farmington Canal Heritage Trail runs through town.
 Fermata Arts Foundation, a cultural center promoting ties with post-soviet countries

Properties owned by Avon Historical Society
 Derrin House  – 18th-century farmhouse
 Living Museum  – former schoolhouse
 Pine Grove School House – former schoolhouse

Politics

Education

Public schools
The Avon Public Schools district contains one high school (Avon High School), one middle school (Avon Middle School)  for grades 7–8, an intermediate school (Thompson Brook School for grades 5–6, and two elementary schools (Roaring Brook School and Pine Grove School).

Private schools
In addition, the Avon Old Farms School, a private, all-boys boarding school, is also located in Avon on Old Farms Rd.

Notable people 

 Joseph Wright Alsop IV, politician and insurance executive; father of Joseph Alsop V
 Craig Burley, former soccer player and commentator for ESPN and BT Sports
 Will Friedle, actor
 Mike Golic, radio announcer for ESPN
 Madison Kennedy, swimmer
 Jessica Lundy, actor
 Kia McNeill, professional soccer player
 Joel Quenneville, former NHL player and coach of the Chicago Blackhawks
 Karl Ravech, Host of Baseball Tonight
 Stuart Scott, ESPN reporter who covered the NBA and other sports
 Trey Wingo, ESPN

References

External links

Avon Official Municipal Web Site

 
Towns in Hartford County, Connecticut
Populated places established in 1645
Towns in Connecticut
1830 establishments in Connecticut
Greater Hartford
1645 establishments in Connecticut